Ronald Ryder is an English former professional rugby league footballer who played in the 1950s.

Playing career

International honours
Ron Ryder won a cap for England while at Warrington in 1952 against Other Nationalities, and won a cap for Great Britain while at Warrington in 1952 against Australia.

Challenge Cup Final appearances
Ron Ryder played right-, i.e. number 3, in Warrington's 19-0 victory over Widnes in the 1950 Challenge Cup Final during the 1949–50 season at Wembley Stadium, London on Saturday 6 May 1950, in front of a crowd of 94,249, and played left-, i.e. number 4, in Warrington's 8-4 victory over Halifax in the 1954 Challenge Cup Final replay during the 1953–54 season at Odsal Stadium, Bradford on Wednesday 5 May 1954, in front of a record crowd of 102,575 or more.

Ron Ryder had not played in the previous 4-4 draw with Halifax in the 1954 Challenge Cup Final during the 1953–54 season at Wembley Stadium, London on Saturday 24 April 1954, in front of a crowd of 81,841, Arnold Stevens had played left-, i.e. number 4, in this match.

County Cup Final appearances
Ron Ryder played right-, i.e. number 3, in Warrington's 5-28 defeat by Wigan in the 1950 Lancashire County Cup Final during the 1950–51 season at Station Road, Swinton on Saturday 4 November 1950.

Club career
Ron Ryder made his début for Warrington on Friday 15 April 1949, and he played his last match for Warrington Saturday 8 May 1954.

References

External links
Mud, blood and memories of the day when 102,575 made history at Odsal
Statistics at wolvesplayers.thisiswarrington.co.uk

Living people
England national rugby league team players
English rugby league players
Great Britain national rugby league team players
Place of birth missing (living people)
Rugby league centres
Warrington Wolves players
Year of birth missing (living people)